Liometopum bogdassarovi is an extinct species of ant in the genus Liometopum, found in Belarus. Described by Nazaraw, Bagdasaraw and Uriew in 1994, the fossils are relatively young and are guessed to be from the Quaternary period, and was originally placed in the genus Iridomyrmex.

References

†
Fossil taxa described in 1994
Prehistoric insects of Europe
Fossil ant taxa
Cenozoic animals